Un Junte para la Historia was a concert from three Puerto Rican bands: Fiel a la Vega, Haciendo Punto en Otro Son, and Moliendo Vidrio, celebrated in Puerto Rico on November 29, 1998. The concert was then released as a DVD and a CD.

The concert featured four sets. The first three sets consisted of each band presenting some of their hit songs. The last set, featured a "junte" (slang for get together) of all three bands performing hit songs from each other.

Track listing

Haciendo Punto en Otro Son
 "Los Carreteros"
 "Vida Campesina"
 "Sal a Caminar"
 "Que Vivan Los Estudiantes" 
 "Yolanda"
 "Cantares"
 Medley
 "La Muralla"

Moliendo Vidrio
 "La Montaña"
 "Sigue Caminando"
 "El Tambor"
 "De Ciales Soy"
 "Peyo Mercé"
 "El Gesto de la Abuela"

Fiel a la Vega
 Medley ("Resurrección", "Todo Cambia y Todo Sigue Igual", "Las Flores de Emilio", "Los Superhéroes", "De Pecho", "Bla,Bla,Bla" & "El Panal") 
 "Al Frente"
 "Granos de Sal"
 "Septiembre, Río Piedras"

El Junte
 "El Son que traigo yo"
 "Las Mujeres de mi Patria"
 "Mujer de 26 años"
 "Canción del Pueblo"
 "El Wanabí"
 "Boricua en la Luna"

Personnel

Fiel a la Vega
 Tito Auger - Lead Vocals, Rhythm guitar
 Ricky Laureano - Lead Guitar, vocals
 Jorge Arraiza - Bass guitar
 Pedro Arraiza - Drums
 Papo Román - Percussion

Haciendo Punto en Otro Son
 Silverio Pérez - Vocals, Guitar
 Tony Croatto - Vocals, Guitar
 Irvin García - Vocals, Percussion
 Josy LaTorre - Vocals

Moliendo Vidrio
 Gary Nuñez
 Sunshine Logroño
 Rosita Velázquez
 Iván Martínez
 Pedro Villalón

Fiel a la Vega albums
1998 live albums